Dodd Fell Hill is a hill in the Yorkshire Dales, in North Yorkshire, England. It is classed as a Marilyn (a hill with topographic prominence of at least 150m).

Marilyns of England
Peaks of the Yorkshire Dales
Hawes